The fungal genus Cochliobolus includes 55 species, including the following plant pathogenic species: C. carbonum, C. heterostrophus, C. miyabeanus, C. sativus and C. lunatus.

Heterothallism and homothallism

Those fungi that need a partner to mate are referred to as heterothallic (self-sterile), and those fungi not needing a partner are referred to as homothallic (self-fertile).  A study of DNA sequences of mating type loci from different heterothallic and homothallic species in the genus Cochliobolus suggests that homothallism can be derived from heterothallism by recombination.

Brief species information 
 Cochliobolus carbonum, affects corn and maize.
 Cochliobolus heterostrophus, "southern corn blight," affects corn and maize.
 Cochliobolus lunatus, affects sugar cane.
 Cochliobolus stenospilus, "brown stripe," affects sugar cane.

See also 

 Phytopathology

References 

 
Fungal plant pathogens and diseases